Nampo Stadium (Chosŏn'gŭl: 남포경기장; Hanja:南浦競技場 ) is a multi-purpose stadium in Nampo, North Korea.  It is currently used mostly for football matches.  The stadium holds 30,000 people and opened in June 1973.The stadium was renovated in 2004, and in 2017

References

See also 
 List of football stadiums in North Korea

Sports venues completed in 1973
Sports venues in North Korea
Football venues in North Korea
Multi-purpose stadiums in North Korea
1973 establishments in North Korea
Buildings and structures in Nampo